Elections to the Labour Party's Shadow Cabinet (more formally, its "Parliamentary Committee") occurred in November 1972.  In addition to the 12 members elected, the Leader (Harold Wilson), Deputy Leader (Edward Short), Labour Chief Whip (Bob Mellish), Chairman of the Parliamentary Labour Party (Douglas Houghton), Labour Leader in the House of Lords (Baron Shackleton), and Labour Chief Whip in the Lords (Baron Beswick) were automatically members.  The Labour Lords elected one further member, Baron Champion.

There was a tie for twelfth place, which required a run-off election between Peter Shore and John Silkin.  However, Silkin withdrew, leaving Shore to take the final place in the cabinet, without an election.

The 12 winners of the election are listed below:

References

1972
Labour Party Shadow Cabinet election
Labour Party (UK) Shadow Cabinet election